Aidan McHugh (born 9 July 2000) is a British professional tennis player.

From Bearsden, he attended St Aloysius' College, Glasgow. He became a client of Andy Murray’s 77 Sports Management firm, where he is joined by fellow tennis players Paul Jubb, Harriet Dart, Katie Swan and Jack Pinnington Jones. His usual training facility is the Scotstoun Sports Campus in Glasgow and he is on the Lawn Tennis Association’s Pro Scholarship Programme. McHugh has been described as Murray’s protégé.

He reached the semi-finals of the 2018 Australian Open – Boys' singles where he defeated Ondrej Styler, Filip Jianu, Jaimée Floyd Angele and Rinky Hijikata before he lost to Tseng Chun-hsin in three sets.

During the COVID-19 pandemic, he took part in the Battle Of The Brits Team Tennis at the National Tennis Centre in London, England. He helped Judy Murray to produce online exercise modules for players of all ages that also involved Andy Murray, Jamie Murray,  and Colin Fleming amongst others.

He received a wildcard on to the main draw of 2021 Nottingham Trophy – Men's singles where he defeated world number 105 Mikhail Kukushkin in straight sets for his first win on the ATP Challenger Tour.

He received a wildcard for the main draw of the 2021 Wimbledon Championships men’s doubles alongside Alastair Gray, and a wildcard into the qualifying for the men’s singles.

Personal life
He is a fan of Celtic F.C.

Career finals

Singles: 11 (5–6)

Doubles: 6 (2–4)

References

2000 births
Living people
British male tennis players
Sportspeople from Glasgow
Scottish male tennis players